Kasolaba or Casolaba was a town of ancient Caria. It was a member of the Delian League since it appears in tribute records of Athens between the years 454/3 and 447/6 BCE, paying a phoros of 2500 drachmae. A herald of the city is cited in a treaty between Mylasa and Cindye of the 4th century BCE. It also appears from this decree that the native population of Anatolia probably abounded in the city, and the city's membership in the Greek world is debatable.

It has been suggested that it should have been located near the coast north or northeast of Halicarnassus but its exact location is unknown. Suggested locations are Kemer, or Güvercinlik Tepesi, both a few miles south of the ancient city of Cindye.

References

Populated places in ancient Caria
Former populated places in Turkey
Greek city-states
Members of the Delian League
Lost ancient cities and towns